Temur Ismailov (born 14 January 1995) is a currently banned Uzbekistani tennis player.

Ismailov has a career high ATP singles ranking of 419 achieved on 22 June 2015. He also has a career high ATP doubles ranking of 943 achieved on 27 July 2015.

Ismailov has represented Uzbekistan at the Davis Cup where he has a W/L record of 0–3.

External links

1995 births
Living people
Uzbekistani male tennis players
Sportspeople from Tashkent
Tennis players at the 2014 Asian Games
Asian Games medalists in tennis
Asian Games bronze medalists for Uzbekistan
Medalists at the 2014 Asian Games
21st-century Uzbekistani people